Vepris suaveolens, synonym Oricia suaveolens, is a species of plant in the family Rutaceae. It is found in Cameroon, the Central African Republic, the Democratic Republic of the Congo, Ivory Coast, Ghana, Guinea, Liberia, Nigeria, and Sierra Leone. It is threatened by habitat loss.

References

Sources

suaveolens
Near threatened plants
Taxonomy articles created by Polbot